Thomas Northcote may refer to:

 Thomas Northcote (silversmith) (1749–1798), British silversmith
 Thomas Northcote (sport shooter) (1893–1991), British Olympic sports shooter

See also
 Northcote W. Thomas (1868–1936), British anthropologist and psychical researcher